Davide Bombardini (born 21 June 1974) is a retired Italian footballer who played as a midfielder.

Career

Early career
Born in Faenza, Emilia–Romagna, 50 km southeast of Bologna, Bombardini started his senior career at Serie D side Imolese Calcio, located at Imola, The Province of Bologna. He then briefly played for Serie B side Pisa which is located in Tuscany region. He then signed by league rival Cesena of Emilia–Romagna. He then played for several Serie C1, Serie C2 and Serie D clubs before signed by southern Italy side Reggina. He was loaned to Serie C1 side Atletico Catania in October and Acireale in January 1999.

Palermo and Roma
Bombardini made his major breakthrough in 1999–2000 in Serie C1 when he signed for U.S. Città di Palermo, where he won the Serie C1 championship in 2001. During the team's next season, in Serie B, he scored 7 league goals.

In June 2002, he signed a 3-year contract for A.S. Roma worth around €0.95 million in gross annually and made his Serie A debut there, whose Roma chairman Franco Sensi was the owner of Palermo until July 2002. Bombardini cost Roma €11 million, but paid via the transfer of 50% registration rights of Franco Brienza who tagged for "€5.5 million", and €5.5 million cash. In 2002–03 financial year, both clubs write-down the value of its player asset, which Bombardini was valued for €540,000 at that time. The co-ownership deal also terminated during the season. However it was not truly write-down, as the residual €10.46 million was included in a special amortise fund along with other toxic player asset, and slowly amortise in 10-year period, which "worth" €80.189 million as asset on 30 June 2006. In 2006–07 financial year, as the club adopted IFRS as accounting standard, the fund was removed from the balance sheet and co-currently the net equity was re-calculated.

Salernitana & Atalanta
In summer 2003 he left for Serie B side Salernitana for free. He played until the bankrupt of the Salerno club. In summer 2005 he joined Serie B side Atalanta, which he played only 10 starts in 23 Serie A appearances at 2006–07 season.

Bologna and AlbinoLeffe
In summer 2007, he joined the team he supported from the childhood Bologna, played 16 starts in 30 Serie B appearances, won the Serie B runner-up with club and gained promotion. In the next season, he played 20 starts in 22 league appearances in the new role of Left Full-Back for the Serie A club, which successfully maintained their place in Serie A.

Despite offered a 1-year extension, In 2009–10 season, he only played 9 league matches before joined Serie B side AlbinoLeffe on 1 February 2010. He signed a contract until 30 June 2011. Bombardini wore no.3 and no.10 in his first and second season for Albino.

After he was sent off on 19 March 2011, he was banned 8-matches and fined €1,500.

Personal life
Bombardini was engaged to Italian television personality and professional model Giorgia Palmas, from 2004 to 2011.

Honours
Palermo
Serie C1: 2001

Atalanta
Serie B: 2006

References

External links
Archive of notable Atletico Catania players, including Bombardini's full career profile 
gazzetta.it 2007
gazzetta.it 2008

aic.football.it
albinoleffe.com

1974 births
Living people
Italian footballers
Serie A players
Serie B players
Pisa S.C. players
S.S. Virtus Lanciano 1924 players
Benevento Calcio players
Reggina 1914 players
Palermo F.C. players
A.S. Roma players
A.S.D. Castel di Sangro Calcio players
U.S. Salernitana 1919 players
Atalanta B.C. players
Bologna F.C. 1909 players
U.C. AlbinoLeffe players
Association football midfielders
Sportspeople from the Province of Ravenna
Imolese Calcio 1919 players
Footballers from Emilia-Romagna